Odessa Airlines was an airline based in Odesa, Ukraine. It operated charter passenger services from Ukraine to destinations in Russia, Syria, Turkey and Germany.  It also carried out agricultural works. Its main base was Odesa International Airport.

History 

The airline was established and started operations in 1996. It was originally part of Aeroflot and separated into an independent organisation, State Aircompany Odessa Airlines, on 29 July 1996. On 20 August 2003, it changed the form of ownership and became Open Joint Stock Company Odessa Airlines. It ceased operations in 2006.

Fleet 

The Odessa Airlines fleet included the following aircraft (at March 2007):

3 Yakovlev Yak-40

References

External links
 Information and photo.

Defunct airlines of Ukraine
Airlines established in 1996
Airlines disestablished in 2006
1996 establishments in Ukraine
2006 disestablishments in Ukraine